Sourav Ganguly is a former Indian cricketer and captain of the India national cricket team. From his international debut in 1992 to his retirement in 2008, he scored centuries (100 or more runs) on 16 occasions in Test cricket and in 22 One Day International (ODI) matches.

Ganguly scored a century on Test debut, against England in Lord's in June 1996. He became the 10th Indian player to perform the feat, and the third player to score a century on debut at the ground. In the next match at Trent Bridge, he made 136 and became the third batsman to make a century in each of his first two innings. He is eighth in the list of leading Test century makers for India. His highest score of 239his only double centurywas made against Pakistan in 2007 at the M. Chinnaswamy Stadium, Bangalore. He made centuries against all Test-cricket playing nations except South Africa and West Indies. His centuries have been scored in fourteen cricket grounds, including eight outside India. He ended up in the nineties on four occasionsincluding two scores of 99.

In ODIs, Ganguly scored centuries against ten opponentsagainst all the cricketing nations that have permanent One Day International status except the West Indies. His first ODI century came against Sri Lanka at the R. Premadasa Stadium, Colombo in August 1997. He made his highest score in the format when he scored 183 against the same team during the 1999 World Cup. As of January 2019, he is joint-eighth in the list of leading century makers in ODIs. Four out of his 22 centuries were scored at home grounds and eighteen were at away (opposition's home) or neutral venues. He was dismissed six times between 90 and 100.

Key

Test centuries

ODI centuries

Notes

References 

Ganguly, Sourav
Centuries